Feyzabad (Persian: فيض آباد; also Romanized as Feyẕābād, Faizābād, and Feyzābād) is a village in the Central District of Zarandieh County, Markazi Province, Iran.

References 

Populated places in Zarandieh County
Cities in Markazi Province